Cochylimorpha nuristana is a species of moth of the family Tortricidae. It is found in Afghanistan and Iran.

The wingspan is 19–25 mm. There are rust-coloured spots on the forewings. The hindwings are variable and much darker in some specimens.

References

Moths described in 1967
Cochylimorpha
Taxa named by Józef Razowski
Moths of Asia